Merksplas is a municipality located in the Belgian province of Antwerp. The municipality comprises only the town of Merksplas proper. In 2021, Merksplas had a total population of 8,616. The total area is 44.56 km².

References

External links

Official website - Available only in Dutch

 
Municipalities of Antwerp Province
Populated places in Antwerp Province